Bütgenbach is a municipality located in the Belgian province of Liège. On January 1, 2006, Bütgenbach had a total population of 5,574. The total area is 97.31 km² which gives a population density of 57 inhabitants per km². As part of the German-speaking Community of Belgium, the official language in this municipality is German.

The municipality consists of the following sub-municipalities: Bütgenbach proper and Elsenborn. It lends its name to a nearby artificial lake.

See also
 List of protected heritage sites in Bütgenbach

References

External links